Great Britain, represented by the British Olympic Association (BOA), competed at the 1980 Summer Olympics in Moscow, Russian SFSR, Soviet Union. British athletes have competed in every Summer Olympic Games. 219 competitors, 149 men and 70 women, took part in 145 events in 14 sports.

In partial support of the American-led boycott, the UK government allowed its athletes to choose whether to compete. There was a boycott of the opening ceremony with Britain being represented solely by the General Secretary of the British Olympic Association, Dick Palmer, carrying the Olympic flag, and no athletes being present. Furthermore, the Olympic flag was raised for the British medal winners in place of the Union Flag, and the Olympic anthem was played instead of God Save the Queen for the five gold medalists.



Medallists

Gold
 Allan Wells — Athletics, Men's 100 metres
 Steve Ovett — Athletics, Men's 800 metres
 Sebastian Coe — Athletics, Men's 1500 metres
 Daley Thompson — Athletics, Men's Decathlon
 Duncan Goodhew — Swimming, Men's 100 m Breaststroke

Silver
 Allan Wells — Athletics, Men's 200 metres
 Sebastian Coe — Athletics, Men's 800 metres
 Neil Adams — Judo, Men's Lightweight (71 kg)
 Henry Clay, Andrew Justice, Chris Mahoney, Duncan McDougall, Malcolm McGowan, Colin Moynihan, John Pritchard, Richard Stanhope, and Allan Whitwell — Rowing, Men's Eights
 Philip Hubble — Swimming, Men's 200 m Butterfly
 Sharron Davies — Swimming, Women's 400 m Individual Medley
 June Croft, Helen Jameson, Margaret Kelly, and Ann Osgerby — Swimming, Women's 4 × 100 m Medley Relay

Bronze
 Steve Ovett — Athletics, Men's 1500 metres
 Gary Oakes — Athletics, Men's 400 m Hurdles
 Beverley Goddard-Callender, Heather Hunte, Sonia Lannaman, and Kathy Smallwood-Cook — Athletics, Women's 4 × 100 m Relay
 Donna Hartley, Joslyn Hoyte-Smith, Linsey MacDonald, and Michelle Probert — Athletics, Women's 4 × 400 m Relay
 Anthony Willis — Boxing, Men's Light Welterweight
 Arthur Mapp — Judo, Men's Open Class
 Malcolm Carmichael and Charles Wiggin — Rowing, Men's Coxless Pairs
 John Beattie, David Townsend, Ian McNuff, and Martin Cross — Rowing, Men's Coxless Fours
 Gary Abraham, Duncan Goodhew, David Lowe, and Trevor Smith — Swimming, Men's 4 × 100 m Medley Relay

Archery

In the third appearance by Great Britain in modern Olympic archery, two men and two women represented the country.  Mark Blenkarne missed winning a medal in the men's competition by only three points, by far the most successful result for Great Britain since archery was returned to the Olympic schedule.

Women's Individual Competition:
 Gillian Patterson — 2216 points (→ 22nd place)
 Christine Harris — 2187 points (→ 25th place)

Men's Individual Competition:
 Mark Blenkarne — 2446 points (→ 4th place)
 Dennis Savory — 2407 points (→ 13th place)

Athletics

Men's Competition
Men's 100 metres
Allan Wells
 Heat — 10.35
 Quarterfinals — 10.11
 Semifinals — 10.27
 Final — 10.25 (→  Gold Medal)

Cameron Sharp
 Heat — 10.38
 Quarterfinals — 10.38
 Semifinals — 10.60 (→ did not advance)

Drew McMaster
 Heat — 10.43
 Quarterfinals — 10.42 (→ did not advance)

Men's 800 metres
Steve Ovett
 Heat — 1:49.4
 Semifinals — 1:46.6
 Final — 1:45.4 (→  Gold Medal)

Sebastian Coe
 Heat — 1:48.5
 Semifinals — 1:46.7
 Final — 1:45.9 (→  Silver Medal)

Dave Warren
 Heat — 1:49.9
 Semifinals — 1:47.2
 Final — 1:49.3 (→ 8th place)

Men's 1,500 metres
Sebastian Coe
 Heat — 3:40.1
 Semifinals — 3:39.4
 Final — 3:38.4 (→  Gold Medal)

Steve Ovett
 Heat — 3:36.8
 Semifinals — 3:43.1
 Final — 3:39.0 (→  Bronze Medal)

Steve Cram
 Heat — 3:44.1
 Semifinals — 3:43.6
 Final — 3:41.0 (→ 8th place)

Men's 10,000 metres
 Brendan Foster
 Heat — 28:55.2
 Final — 28:22.6 (→ 11th place)

 Mike McLeod
 Heat — 28:57.3
 Final — 28:40.8 (→ 12th place)

 Geoff Smith
 Heat — 30:00.1 (→ did not advance)

Men's Marathon
 Dave Black
 Final — did not finish (→ no ranking)

 Bernie Ford
 Final — did not finish (→ no ranking)

 Ian Thompson
 Final — did not finish (→ no ranking)

Men's 4x400 metres Relay
 Alan Bell, Terry Whitehead, Rod Milne, and Glen Cohen
 Heat — 3:05.9
 Final — did not finish (→ no ranking)

Men's 110 m Hurdles
 Wilbert Greaves
 Heat — 13.85
 Semifinals — 13.98 (→ did not advance)

 Mark Holtom
 Heat — 13.83
 Semifinals — 13.94 (→ did not advance)

Men's 400 m Hurdles
 Gary Oakes
 Heat — 50.39
 Semifinals — 50.07
 Final — 49.11 (→  Bronze  Medal)

Men's 3,000 m Steeplechase
 Colin Reitz
 Heat — 8:35.3
 Semifinals — 8:29.8 (→ did not advance)

 Roger Hackney
 Heat — 8:36.4
 Semifinals — 8:29.2 (→ did not advance)

 Tony Staynings
 Heat — 8:47.5
 Semifinals — 8:52.3 (→ did not advance)

Men's Pole Vault
 Brian Hooper
 Qualification — 5.35 m
 Final — 5.35 m (→ 11th place)

Men's High Jump
 Mark Naylor
 Qualification — 2.21 m
 Final — 2.21 m (→ 9th place)

Men's triple jump
Keith Connor
 Qualification — 16.57 m
 Final — 16.87 m (→ 4th place)

Men's Shot Put
Geoff Capes
 Qualification — 19.75 m
 Final — 20.50 m (→ 5th place)

Men's Javelin Throw
 David Ottley
 Qualification — 77.20 m (→ did not advance, 14th place)

Men's Hammer Throw
Chris Black
 Qualification — 66.74 m (→ did not advance, 14th place)

Paul Dickenson
 Qualification — 64.22 m (→ did not advance, 15th place)

Men's Decathlon
 Daley Thompson
 Final — 8495 points (→  Gold Medal)

 Bradley McStravick
 Final — 7616 points (→ 15th place)

Men's 20 km Walk
 Roger Mills
 Final — 1:32:37.8 (→ 10th place)

Men's 50 km Walk
 Ian Richards
 Final — 4:22:57 (→ 11th place)

Women's Competition
Women's 100 metres
 Kathy Smallwood-Cook
 Heat — 11.37
 Quarterfinals — 11.24
 Semifinals — 11.30
 Final — 11.28 (→ 6th place)

 Heather Hunte-Oakes
 Heat — 11.40
 Quarterfinals — 11.25
 Semifinals — 11.36
 Final — 11.34 (→ 8th place)

 Sonia Lannaman
 Heat — 11.58
 Quarterfinals — 11.20
 Semifinals — 11.38 (→ did not advance)

Women's 800 metres
 Christina Boxer-Cahill
 Heat — 2:02.1
 Semifinals — 2:00.9 (→ did not advance)

Women's 1,500 metres
 Janet Marlow
 Heat — 4:15.9 (→ did not advance)

Women's 100 m Hurdles
Shirley Strong
 Heat — 13.39
 Semifinal — 13.12 (→ did not advance)

Lorna Boothe
 Heat — 13.86 (→ did not advance)

Women's High Jump
Louise Miller
 Qualification — 1.88 m
 Final — 1.85 m (→ 11th place)

Women's Long Jump
 Susan Hearnskaw
 Qualification — 6.66 m
 Final — 6.50 m (→ 9th place)

 Sue Reeve
 Qualifying Round — 6.48 m
 Final — 6.46 m (→ 10th place)

Women's Discus Throw
 Meg Ritchie
 Qualification — 58.66 m
 Final — 61.16 m (→ 9th place)

Women's Javelin Throw
 Tessa Sanderson
 Qualification — 48.76 m (→ did not advance)

 Fatima Whitbread
 Qualification — 47.44 m (→ did not advance)

Women's Shot Put
 Angela Littlewood
 Final — 17.53 m (→ 13th place)

Women's Pentathlon
 Judy Livermore — 4304 points (→ 13th place)
 100 metres — 13.57 s
 Shot Put — 13.56 m
 High Jump — 1.77 m
 Long Jump — 5.71 m
 800 metres — 2:25.30
 Susan Longden — 4234 points (→ 15th place)
 100 metres — 14.10 s
 Shot Put — 11.47 m
 High Jump — 1.74 m
 Long Jump — 6.09 m
 800 metres — 2:19.60
 Yvette Wray — 4159 points (→ 16th place)
 100 metres — 13.78 s
 Shot Put — 12.01 m
 High Jump — 1.65 m
 Long Jump — 5.60 m
 800 metres — 2:15.90

Boxing

Men's Flyweight (51 kg)
 Keith Wallace
 First Round — Bye
 Second Round — Lost to Daniel Radu (Romania) on points (1-4)

Men's Bantamweight (54 kg)
 Raymond Gilbody
 First Round — Bye
 Second Round — Defeated João Luis de Almeida (Angola) on points (5-0)
 Third Round — Lost to Daniel Zaragoza (Mexico) on points (1-4)

Men's Featherweight (57 kg)
 Peter Joseph Hanlon
 First Round — Bye
 Second Round — Defeated Antonio Esparragoza (Venezuela) on points (4-1)
 Third Round — Lost to Viktor Rybakov (Soviet Union) on points (0-5)

Men's Lightweight (60 kg)
 George Gilbody
 First Round — Bye
 Second Round — Defeated Blackson Siukoko (Zambia) on points (4-1)
 Quarter Finals — Lost to Richard Nowakowski (East Germany) on points (5-0)

Men's Light-Welterweight (63.5 kg)
 Anthony Willis → Bronze Medal
 First Round — Defeated Jaime Soares França (Brazil) on points (5-0)
 Second Round — Defeated Shadrach Odhiambo (Sweden) on points (5-0)
 Quarter Finals — Defeated William Lyimo (Tanzania) after knock-out in third round
 Semi Finals — Lost to Patrizio Oliva (Italy) on points (0-5)

Canoeing

Cycling

Twelve cyclists represented Great Britain in 1980.

Individual road race
 John Herety
 Jeff Williams
 Neil Martin
 Joseph Waugh

Team time trial
 Robert Downs
 Des Fretwell
 Steve Jones
 Joseph Waugh

Sprint
 Terrence Tinsley

1000m time trial
 Terrence Tinsley

Individual pursuit
 Sean Yates

Team pursuit
 Tony Doyle
 Malcolm Elliott
 Glen Mitchell
 Sean Yates

Diving

Men's Springboard
 Christopher Snode
 Preliminary Round — 557.10 points (→ 5th place)
 Final — 844.470 points (→ 6th place)

Men's Platform
 Christopher Snode
 Preliminary Round — 468.21 points (→ 9th place, did not advance)

 Martyn Brown
 Preliminary Round — 380.91 points (→ 19th  place, did not advance)

Fencing

Eleven fencers, six men and five women, represented Great Britain in 1980.

Men's foil
 Pierre Harper
 Rob Bruniges

Men's team foil
 John Llewellyn, Steven Paul, Rob Bruniges, Pierre Harper

Men's épée
 Steven Paul
 John Llewellyn
 Neal Mallett

Men's team épée
 Steven Paul, John Llewellyn, Neal Mallett, Rob Bruniges

Men's sabre
 Mark Slade

Women's foil
 Ann Brannon
 Linda Ann Martin
 Susan Wrigglesworth

Women's team foil
 Susan Wrigglesworth, Ann Brannon, Wendy Ager-Grant, Linda Ann Martin, Hilary Cawthorne

Gymnastics

Judo

Modern pentathlon

Three male pentathletes represented Great Britain in 1980.

Individual
 Robert Nightingale — 5,168 pts, 15th place
 Peter Whiteside — 5,085 pts, 21st place
 Nigel Clark — 4,809 pts, 33rd place

Team:
 Nightingale, Whiteside and Clark — 15,062pts, 8th place

Rowing

Men's Single scull
Hugh Matheson
 (→ 6th place)

Men's Double scull
Jim Clark, Chris Baillieu
 (→ 4th place)

Men's Coxless pair  
 Malcolm Carmichael,  Charles Wiggin
 (→ Bronze)

Men's Coxed pair
 James MacLeod, Neil Christie, David Webb
 (→ 9th place)

Men's Coxless four 
 John Beattie, David Townsend, Ian McNuff, Martin Cross
 (→ Bronze)

Men's Coxed four 
 Lenny Robertson, Gordon Rankine, Colin Seymour, John Roberts, Alan Inns
 (→ 7th place)Men's Eight 
 Henry Clay, Andrew Justice, Chris Mahoney, Duncan McDougall, Malcolm McGowan, John Pritchard, Richard Stanhope, Allan Whitwell, Colin Moynihan
 (→ Silver)Women's Single scull Beryl Mitchell
 (→ 5th place)Women's Double scull  
 Sue Handscomb, Astrid Ayling
 (→ 7th place)Women's Coxed four Pauline Janson, Bridget Buckley, Pauline Hart, Jane Cross, Sue Brown
 (→ 6th place)Women's Eight 
 Gillian Hodges, Joanna Toch, Penny Sweet, Lin Clark, Elizabeth Paton, Rosie Clugston, Nicola Boyes, Beverly Jones, Pauline Wright
 (→ 5th place)

Swimming

Men's CompetitionMen's 100 m Freestyle Mark Taylor
 Heats — 52.65 (→ did not advance)Men's 200 m Freestyle Martin Smith
 Heats — 1:54.17 (→ did not advance)

 Kevin Lee
 Heats — 1:55.63 (→ did not advance)Men's 100 m Butterfly Gary Abraham
 Final — 55.42 (→ 6th place)Men's 200 m Butterfly Philip Hubble
 Final — 2:01.20 (→  Silver Medal)

 Peter Morris
 Final — 2:02.27 (→ 4th place)

 Stephen Poulter
 Final — 2:02.93 (→ 8th place)Men's 100 m Breaststroke Duncan Goodhew
 Final — 1:03.44 (→  Gold Medal)

 Leigh Atkinson
 Heats — 1:06.43 (→ did not advance)Men's 200 m Breaststroke Duncan Goodhew
 Final — 2:20.92 (→ 6th place)Men's 100 m Backstroke Gary Abraham
 Final — 58.38 (→ 8th place)Men's 200 m Backstroke Douglas Campbell
 Final — 2:04.23 (→ 7th place)Men's 4 × 200 m Freestyle Relay Douglas Campbell, Philip Hubble, Martin Smith, and Andrew Astbury
 Final — 7:30.81 (→ 6th place)Men's 4 × 100 m Medley Relay Gary Abraham, Duncan Goodhew, David Lowe, and Martin Smith
 Final — 3:47.71 (→  Bronze Medal)

Women's CompetitionWomen's 200 m Freestyle June Croft
 Final — 2:03.15 (→ 6th place)Women's 100 m Butterfly Ann Osgerby
 Final — 1:02.21 (→ 4th place)

 Janet Osgerby
 Final — 1:02.90 (→ 8th place)Women's 200 m Butterfly Ann Osgerby
 Final — 2:14.83 (→ 6th place)Women's 100 m Breaststroke Margaret Kelly
 Heats — 1:12.38
 Final — 1:11.48 (→ 4th place)

 Susannah Brownsdon
 Heats — 1:12.83
 Final — 1:12.11 (→ 6th place)Women's 400 m Individual Medley Sharron Davies
 Heats — 4:52.38
 Final — 4:46.83 (→  Silver Medal)

Sarah Kerswell
 Heats — 5:03.75 (→ did not advance)Women's 4 × 100 m Freestyle Relay Sharron Davies, Kaye Lovatt, Jacquelina Willmott, and June Croft
 Final — 3:51.71 (→ 4th place)Women's 4 × 100 m Medley Relay Helen Jameson, Margaret Kelly, Ann Osgerby, and June Croft
 Final — 4:12.24 (→  Silver Medal''')

Weightlifting

Wrestling

References

Nations at the 1980 Summer Olympics
1980
Summer Olympics